Vladan Stojković (born 22 January 1971) is a retired Serbian football goalkeeper.

He is a brother of Vladimir Stojković and father of  Vladimir Stojković, both fellow goalkeepers.

References

1971 births
Living people
Serbian footballers
FK Spartak Subotica players
FK Mačva Šabac players
A.D. Ovarense players
Leça F.C. players
Association football goalkeepers
Primeira Liga players
Serbian expatriate footballers
Expatriate footballers in Portugal
Serbian expatriate sportspeople in Portugal